George Gillingham DD (d. 16 December 1668) was a Canon of Windsor from 1639 - 1668.

Career

He was educated at Broadgates Hall, Oxford where he graduated BA 1614 and MA in 1617. He was awarded DD from Pembroke College, Oxford in 1636.

He was appointed:
Rector of Ging Hospital (Fryerning), Essex 1630
Rector of Chalton with Clanfield, Hampshire 1633 - 1668
Chaplain to King Charles I

He was appointed to the twelfth stall in St George's Chapel, Windsor Castle in 1639, despite being ejected in 1644 and effectively unable to function as a Canon, he held the stall until 1668.

Notes 

1668 deaths
Canons of Windsor
Alumni of Broadgates Hall, Oxford
Alumni of Pembroke College, Oxford
Year of birth missing